The 1959 Air Force Falcons football team represented the United States Air Force Academy as an independent during the 1959 NCAA University Division football season. Led by second-year head coach Ben Martin, the Falcons played their home games at DU Stadium in Denver and Folsom Field in Boulder, Colorado. They outscored their opponents 160–124 and finished with a record of 5–4–1.

This was the first year the Falcons played Army, a respectable  before 67,000 at Yankee Stadium in   The two academies met in odd-numbered years (except 1961) through 1971, and have played annually in the competition (with Navy) for the Commander-in-Chief's Trophy, first awarded in 1972.

Following the Army game, the Falcons were at  but lost three of four in November.

Schedule

References

Air Force
Air Force Falcons football seasons
Air Force Falcons football